is the title of the film edition of the 35th Super Sentai Series Kaizoku Sentai Gokaiger. The superhero film was released on August 6, 2011, double-billed with the Kamen Rider OOO film Kamen Rider OOO Wonderful: The Shogun and the 21 Core Medals, and was released in both 2D and 3D formats. During their adventure, they must face Los Dark, the captain of the ghost ship, and a host of revived enemies of the previous Super Sentai teams such as Agent Abrella, Baseball Mask and several enemy grunts.

Plot
While on his morning jog, Gai Ikari finds the sky suddenly turning dark as a massive ship emerges from the clouds. Becoming Gokai Silver to investigate in GouZyu Rex, Gai is shocked to find what seemed to be GokaiOh appearing from the ship and attacking him. Defeating GouZyuJin, Fake GokaiOh jumps back to the ship as it immediately disappears. Later, aboard the Gokai Galleon, the crew identify the mysterious vessel as the space-wandering ghost ship said to carry a fabled treasure known as the God Eye—which can grant any wish to its holder. Seeing this as a better opportunity to obtain the Greatest Treasure in the Universe regardless of the risks, the Gokai Galleon crew embark on a voyage to find the ghost ship and acquire the God Eye. The Gokai Galleon locates the ghost ship and makes port in its skull figurehead's mouth. After encountering a trio of annoying ghosts who unknowingly pointed them in the right direction, the Gokai Galleon crew reach the ship's main bridge and see the God Eye resting on the left eye of a giant skull. However, they are stopped by the ship's captain Los Dark, who reveals that he was luring would-be thieves to his lair as he sends the crew into a dimensional underworld so his minions can kill them and allow him to live again.

The crew wind up at a park, finding themselves surrounded by ghosts of previous Super Sentai enemy grunts. After the Gokaigers take down several of them, the remaining members from each grunt group merge to form the Combined Combatant. Though the stronger opponent, the Combined Combatant proves to be unstable due to internal conflicting among the grunts composing him over who gets to finish the pirates off. Taking advantage, the Gokaigers use the Battle Fever J Keys to destroy the Combined Combatant with the Penta Force Cannon, the explosion sending them to a baseball stadium, where they confront Baseball Mask of the Black Cross Army who challenges them to a game of baseball. Using the Gorenger Keys, execute the Gorenger Hurricane baseball to accept the Masked Monster's challenge. The Gokaigers score two strikes, and the third one being a distraction move using the G3 Princess trio. The resulting explosion from Baseball Mask's demise sends the Gokaigers into yet another dimension, where they are attacked by Agent Abrella and his Mechanoid army.

Realizing they have no chance if they continue fighting the specters of old Sentai foes without an end in sight, the crew decides to be a distraction with the Dekaranger Keys while Captain Marvelous uses the Red Hawk Key to fly through the portal back into the ghost ship. Emerging, Gokai Red sees Los Dark closing the portal so his crew cannot escape before engaging the specter in a fight between captains. Using the epic battle against Los Dark to get it, Captain Marvelous grabs the God Eye and wishes for his crew's safe return as the item is revealed to be a fake before being shattered. Though defeated by the Gokaigers' Gokai Blast and Slash Final Wave, Los Dark summons Fake GokaiOh as the Gokaigers form GokaiOh to engage their opponent in battle from on the Ghost Ship's mast to its deck. When Fake GokaiOh is about to fire its main cannon, the Gokaigers summon Variblune, Pat Striker, Magi Dragon, Geki Tiger and Dragon Headder to destroy Fake GokaiOh in an explosion that consumes the Ghost Ship. Back aboard the Gokai Galleon, the crew is having a hearty lunch while Gai arrives and is disappointed upon learning the God Eye was a fake as the pirates assure him that they will have more fun finding the Greatest Treasure without it.

Characters

From series
Gokaigers:

Space Empire Zangyack:

Film only
: The undead captain of a ghost ship who seeks the God Eye's power to make his desires a reality.
: Los Dark's mecha, which is an imitation of GokaiOh with a larger hat, an eye patch, a cape and a large hook in place of the left hand. In addition to the two Gokai Ken swords, Fake GokaiOh is armed with a cannon on its left arm and a laser beam on its eye patch. Its main cannon is larger than GokaiOh's Gokai Hō and has five smaller cannons around it.
: A fused form of the various revived grunts from previous enemy organizations that follow Los Dark.
: A trio of ghosts that reside in Los Dark's ship, harassing the Gokai Galleon crew while unknowingly pointing them in the direction of the God Eye while singing of never telling them where it is.

Returning characters

Past Combatants

 

:

Cast
 Captain Marvelous: Ryota Ozawa
 Joe Gibken: Yuki Yamada
 Luka Millfy: Mao Ichimichi
 Don Dogoier: Kazuki Shimizu
 Ahim de Famille: Yui Koike
 Gai Ikari: Junya Ikeda
 Navi: Yukari Tamura
 Los Dark: Kenji Utsumi
 Warz Gill: Hirofumi Nojima
 Damaras: Kōji Ishii
 Insarn, Baseball park announcer: Kikuko Inoue
 Barizorg: Gaku Shindo
 Agent Abrella: Ryūsei Nakao
 Baseball Mask: Ichirō Nagai
 Gatsun: Isao Sasaki
 Beron: Mitsuko Horie
 Pachin: Tsuyoshi Matsubara
 Past Combatants: Yūki Anai
 Saki Rōyama: Rina Aizawa
 Miu Sutō: Yumi Sugimoto
 Kegalesia: Nao Oikawa
 Narration, Mobilate Voice, Gokai Sabre Voice, Gokai Gun Voice, Gokai Cellular Voice: Tomokazu Seki

References

External links
Official website for "Kaizoku Sentai Gokaiger The Movie: The Flying Ghost Ship" & Kamen Rider OOO: The Shogun and the 21 Core Medals

2011 films
Gokaiger The Movie: The Flying Ghost Ship
Crossover tokusatsu films
2011 3D films
Japanese 3D films
Films scored by Kousuke Yamashita
Films about wish fulfillment